Dalia Kuodytė (born 21 January 1962 in Kaunas) is a Lithuanian historian and politician. As a historian, she specialises in the history of the  Lithuanian independence movement, and as a politician, serves in the Seimas for the Liberal Movement party from 2012 to 2016.

References 

1962 births
Living people
Lithuanian historians
Lithuanian politicians